Paweł Włodzimierz Szałamacha (born 24 January 1969, in Gorzów Wielkopolski, Poland) is a Polish politician, member of the National Bank of Poland Management Board, and a former Minister of Finance.

He was a deputy minister at the Ministry of State Treasury in the years 2005–2007, and a member of the Sejm in the years 2011– 2015. Szałamacha was the Minister of Finance, in office 16 November 2015 to 28 September 2016. He graduated from the Faculty of Law and Administration of Adam Mickiewicz University in Poznań, received a Master of Laws in European Union law from the College of Europe and a mid-career Master of Public Administration from the John F. Kennedy School of Government at Harvard University.

References

1969 births
Finance Ministers of Poland
Living people
People from Gorzów Wielkopolski
Harvard Kennedy School alumni
Members of the Polish Sejm 2011–2015
Adam Mickiewicz University in Poznań alumni
College of Europe alumni